Yxta Maya Murray is an American Latina novelist and professor at Loyola Marymount School of Law.

Career
Murray graduated cum laude from the University of California, Los Angeles and received her JD from Stanford University with distinction.
She teaches at Loyola Law School.

Her writing has appeared in Buzz, Glamour, and ZYZZYVA, and her novel "The Conquest" won the 1999 Whiting Award.

Reception
Locas - "Murray perfectly captures the patois and fury of the Mexican women..." and "The reader equipped with a Spanish-English dictionary has the best chance to grasp all the nuances of this convincing, under-the-skin work.",  "It's that predictable both in plot and texture." and "A female Scarface, this straightforward narrative charts the rise and fall of Latin gangsters on L.A.'s mean streets with considerable documentary fervor but not much depth.",  "Even if Locas is as persuasive and true-sounding as a smart documentary, Murray keeps her novel as tight as her main character keeps her mind..."

What it Takes to Get to Vegas - "The suffering hero, the bullet in the gut, come to think of it, this does sound like The Natural, doesn't it? But the boxing story works, told to us by a femme fatale for whom we can feel much sympathy.",  "uneven but arresting" and "Readable and intelligent, though this writer of promise and ferocious energy needs to scrutinize her subject matter a little more deeply."

The Conquest - "Another ponderous and trendy novel from Murray..." and "A fluid and genuinely interesting story badly weighed down by leaden prose ... and a thoroughly hackneyed view of Latin American history.",  "The subplot about Sara's literary sleuthing ties the two stories neatly together and gives the book a satisfying edge of suspense."

The Queen Jade - "Fiery beauties and rakish hunks can't enliven this overblown melodrama.",  "These entertaining characters are all sharply drawn, and the depiction of the teeming jungle is breathtaking. But Murray is less successful at conveying the mythos of the Queen Jade and the history of its pursuit."

The King's Gold: An Old World Novel of Adventure - "In heroine Sanchez, Murray has created a perfect counterweight to the traditional macho hero."

The Good Girl's Guide To Getting Kidnapped - " This may not be great literature, but it holds strong appeal for teens who can't get enough street lit.",  "This fast-paced story, heavy with street dialogue and slang, should have ample teen appeal."

Works

  (reprint)
   (reprint)

 The Good Girl's Guide to Getting Kidnapped, Razorbill (January 7, 2010)

Awards
 1999 Whiting Award
 1996 National Magazine Award for Fiction

Criticism
"Yxta Maya Murray on ‘Love and Consequences’ Hoax", truthdig, Mar 4, 2008

References

External links

Profile at The Whiting Foundation
"Review: Good Girl's Guide to getting kidnapped (ARC) by Yxta Maya Murray", PeaceLove&Pat
"Yxta Maya Murray", Zócalo Public Square
"What Makes an L.A. Writer?", Zócalo Public Square
"Book Club Girl Interview with Yxta Maya Murray, author of The King's Gold", Blog Talk Radio
"Dennis Miller Show", TV.com
 "Locas, (Internet Archive) "
"What It Takes to Get to Vegas, (Google books)"
"The Queen Jade, (Google books)"

20th-century American novelists
21st-century American novelists
American women novelists
American writers of young adult literature
Living people
Lawyers from Los Angeles
Legal educators
American women lawyers
Hispanic and Latino American writers
University of California, Los Angeles alumni
Stanford University alumni
20th-century American women writers
21st-century American women writers
Women writers of young adult literature
1970 births